The Thames Magistrates' Court is a magistrates' court in Bow, London, England.

It is located near the Bow Road tube station

The Thames Magistrates' Court is part of Her Majesty's Court System.

References 

The court has been mentioned in these news articles:

 
 

Magistrates' courts in England and Wales
Court buildings in London
Bow, London